Kammarheit is a Swedish dark ambient project. The only member of this project is Pär Boström, who is a resident of Umeå, Sweden. It currently runs on the label Cyclic Law.

Discography

Official Albums 
 Asleep and Well Hidden (2003)
 The Starwheel (2005)
 The Nest (2015)
 Thronal (2020)

Unofficial Albums 
 Shockwork (2000)
 Among The Ruins (2001)
 At The Heart Of Destruction (2001)
 Somewhere Concealed (2002)
 The Downfall And The Arising (2002)
 The Northern Hymn (2002)

Compilations 
 Nord Ambient Alliance (2002)
 LIVE AKTION – Klabböle Kraftverk (2002–2004)
 Triune (161st Cycle) (2020)

Other Releases 
Of Dawn And Of Ice, Split EP with Phelios (2009)

Cities Last Broadcast 
Cities Last Broadcast is the side and lone project of Pär Boström. The debut, The Cancelled Earth was released through Cyclic Law, but every album thereafter was signed with Cryo Chamber. His typical style is experimental and consists of field recordings, old reel-to-reel tape recorders, tape loops, piano and acoustic, and de-tuned instruments played through a pile of effect pedals, all combined in a modern studio with modern mixing techniques. Miles To Midnight is described as a "Dark Jazz Ambient album" with live jazz drums, tape loops, piano and bass.

Official Albums 

 The Cancelled Earth (2009)
 The Humming Tapes (2016)
 The Umbra Report (2021)

Collaborations with other artists 

 Black Corner Den (with Atrium Carceri) (2017)
 Miles To Midnight (with Atrium Carceri and God Body Disconnect) (2018)
 Black Stage of Night (with Atrium Carceri) (2019)

Compilation Singles 

 Cabinet (Eudoxus by Various Artists) (2016)
 Static (Terra Relicta Presents: Vol. I Dark Ambient by Various Artists) (2016)
 Mirrorlike (Where Words Fail, Music Speaks - A Compilation For Ania Mehring by Various Artists) (2016)
 Voiced (Vol.1 Dark Ambient by This Is Darkness) (2017)
 Unbidden (Vol.2 Nothingness by This Is Darkness) (2019)
 Each Night (Tomb Of Wights by Cyro Chamber) (2021)

References

External links 
 Official Website
 Discogs
 Kammarheit - MySpace
 Cities Last Broadcast - MySpace

Swedish industrial music groups
Swedish electronic music groups
Dark ambient music groups